World Series of Fighting 1: Arlovski vs. Cole was the inaugural event of the promotion held on  at the Planet Hollywood Resort and Casino in Las Vegas, United States.  The main card began at 10:30 p.m. Eastern Time and the preliminary card was streamed on Sherdog.com.

Background

The event underwent changes, as Gesias Cavalcante was originally scheduled to face John Gunderson, but instead faced TJ O'Brien. Also, a bout between Waylon Lowe and Fabio Mello was scrapped for unknown reasons.

Kickboxing star Tyrone Spong made his MMA debut at this event. 

The event was deemed as a success by many critics.

Results

See also 
 World Series of Fighting
 List of WSOF champions
 List of WSOF events

References

World Series of Fighting events
2012 in mixed martial arts
Zappos Theater
Events in Paradise, Nevada